Tobias Kamke (born 21 May 1986) is a German former professional tennis player. He was ranked as high as world No. 64 in singles by the Association of Tennis Professionals (ATP), which he first achieved in January 2011. In 2010, Kamke was awarded Newcomer of the Year by the ATP after slashing his singles ranking from No. 254 to No. 67 by year-end following four finals on the ATP Challenger Tour, having beaten emerging players Milos Raonic and Ryan Harrison in two of the finals for the titles, and a third round appearance at the Wimbledon Championships, his career-best performance at a major. Kamke announced his retirement in July 2022 and played his last professional match at the Hamburg European Open.

Professional career

2008
Although losing to No. 134 Jan Hernych in the final qualifying round, Kamke reached the main draw in singles of the Wimbledon Championships as a lucky loser. However, he then lost his first match to world No. 30, Andreas Seppi.

2010
He made the main draw at Wimbledon where he progressed through to the first and second rounds and then lost to 10th seed Jo-Wilfried Tsonga, 1–6, 4–6, 6–7. In July, he won the Challenger Banque Nationale de Granby by beating Milos Raonic in the final, 6–3, 7–6. At the Tiburon Challenger, he secured his second career Challenger title by defeating Ryan Harrison in the final. He reached back-to-back second rounds on ATP World Tour-level at Stockholm, Vienna and Basel.

As Kamke started the year as world No. 254 and finished it as world No. 67, he was awarded "Newcomer of the Year" by the ATP.

2011
2011 saw Kamke reach career-high rankings in both singles (world No. 64 in January) and doubles (world No. 419 in October).

2012
Kamke faced Roger Federer in the first round of the French Open. He led Federer by 4–1 in the second set before losing 2–6, 5–7, 3–6. In September, he reached a new career-high in doubles at world No. 256.

2022 
Kamke announced his retirement in July 2022 and played his last professional match at the Hamburg European Open in the doubles tournament with Dustin Brown; they lost in the first round.

Singles performance timeline

ATP Challenger and ITF Futures finals

Singles: 20 (11–9)

Doubles: 7 (3–4)

Head-to-head record against top 10 players
Kamke's match record against players who have been ranked in the top ten. Only ATP Tour main-draw and Davis Cup matches are considered. Players who have been No. 1 are in boldface.

  James Blake 1–0
  Taylor Fritz 1–0
  Juan Martín del Potro 1–0
  Fabio Fognini 1–1
  Jürgen Melzer 1–1
  Tommy Robredo 1–1
  Tomáš Berdych 1–2
  Roberto Bautista Agut 0–1
  Pablo Carreño Busta 0–1
  Mardy Fish 0–1
  David Goffin 0–1
  Lleyton Hewitt 0–1
  Tommy Haas 0–1
  Daniil Medvedev 0–1
  Andy Murray 0–1
  Rafael Nadal 0–1
  Jack Sock 0–1
  Radek Štěpánek 0–1
  Janko Tipsarević 0–1
  Stan Wawrinka 0–1
  Marcos Baghdatis 0–2
  Marin Čilić 0–2
  Roger Federer 0–2
  Richard Gasquet 0–2
  John Isner 0–2
  Milos Raonic 0–2
  Fernando Verdasco 0–2
  Alexander Zverev 0–2
  Nicolás Almagro 0–3
  David Ferrer 0–3
  Jo-Wilfried Tsonga 0–3
  Juan Mónaco 0–4

Top 10 wins

References

External links
 
 
 

1986 births
German male tennis players
Sportspeople from Lübeck
Living people